Silver Palm is an unincorporated community and historic district in Miami-Dade County, Florida, United States. Formerly a distinct community in the first half of the 20th century, it has now been absorbed into other communities in the region. The Homestead and Redland District directory for 1927-1928 includes the community of Silver Palm. The community name survives in Silver Palm Drive and the Silver Palm Schoolhouse.

Geography
Silver Palm is located at about 25°33'N 80°27'W (25.551,-80.441), with an elevation .

See also
Silver Palm Schoolhouse
Silver Palm Drive

References

Unincorporated communities in Miami-Dade County, Florida
Unincorporated communities in Florida